Terra Cotta is an unincorporated community in McHenry County, in the U.S. state of Illinois.

History
A post office called Terra Cotta was established in 1886, and remained in operation until it was discontinued in 1927. The community was named after a local terracotta pottery works.

References

Unincorporated communities in McHenry County, Illinois
Unincorporated communities in Illinois